Dame Susan Elizabeth Ion  (née Burrows; born 3 February 1955) is a British engineer and an expert advisor on the nuclear power industry.

Ion was elected a member of the National Academy of Engineering in 2012 for contributions to nuclear fuel development.

Early life and education
Born on 3 February 1955 in Cumbria, she is the daughter of Lawrence James Burrows, a planning officer for British Rail, and Doris Burrows (née Cherry), a secretary.

Ion was educated at Penwortham Girls Grammar School near Preston, Lancashire in the same year as Nancy Rothwell. As a young student, she enjoyed science, which her parents encouraged by letting her do chemistry experiments in the family's kitchen.

At school, she took a leadership role as Head Girl from 1972 to 1973 and deputy leader of the orchestra. At 16, Ion won a book on atomic energy as a prize for her O-levels in science, which helped inspire her enthusiasm for the topic. She recalled, "When I was in school ... it was quite different. You were given every encouragement possible to do science subjects if you were interested in them".

Ion went on to study Materials Science at Imperial College London, where she gained a first-class honours degree in 1976, and subsequently a PhD in Metallurgy and Materials Science in 1979, supervised by F.J. Humphreys and S.H. White.

She taught in an inner-city school in London while completing her doctorate, and used supplies from the college laboratories in her lessons to help students become enthusiastic about the industry. "Where there is no vision ... the people perish", she says.

Career and research

In 1979, Ion was first hired as a technical officer at British Nuclear Fuels (BNFL). At the time, she and one other woman were the only females working in the chemical engineering department.

In 1992, she was promoted to Executive Director of Technology, a position Ion held within the organisation until 2006.

During this time, nuclear or atomic energy was viewed as a valuable source of energy, along with the existing coal industry, and a necessary part of rebuilding post-war Britain. It was, according to Ion, an exciting industry with a vibrant research and development program and great prospects. As she told Jim Al-Khalili in a 2013 interview for BBC Radio Four, "Nothing over time has changed my view of that".

As technical director of BNFL, Ion held a seat on Tony Blair's Council for Science and Technology and has been credited with persuading Blair to change Labour's official government's policy on nuclear power.

Ion's work, along with David King, took about 10 years of educating government officials to consider the scientific evidence surrounding the issues of nuclear power and renewable energy to inform policy. She helped advise Gordon Brown on long-term energy policies.

In 2004, Ion was among 180 women invited to a "Women's Theme Day" luncheon at Buckingham Palace in recognition of her contributions to the field of science and technology.

Ion was elected a Fellow of the Royal Academy of Engineering (FREng) in 1996 and was a vice-president from 2002 to 2008.

In 2006, Ion was appointed visiting professor of Imperial College and admitted to the Fellowship of the college in 2005.

Nuclear power and renewable energy

Ion has studied energy supplies for more than 30 years. She spent a lot of time early in her career advising government officials about nuclear reactors and countering the negativity caused by the incidents at Three Mile Island and Chernobyl.

Ion supports the development of smaller, modular versions of nuclear reactors for their economy of size, portability and cost. These smaller reactors would, most likely, be housed on existing nuclear sites licensed for that purpose.

Ion views her biggest challenge is "persuading decades-worth of politicians that nuclear energy is really needed." Her position is that renewable energy sources (particularly wind power), coal and nuclear power will be necessary components of Britain's energy policy moving forward.

Science education and gender stereotypes
In Ion's outreach as a spokesperson for the nuclear power industry, she has expressed a belief that more needs to be done to attract women into the field of engineering. She has expressed concerns that some areas of the educational system still view engineering as a subject only for males.

While major institutions may support the idea of females entering the field of science and engineering, Ion notes that grade schools under the current system may not provide the prerequisite coursework early enough in students' academic careers for them to be successful at university.

Ion supports educational programs that support all students, regardless of gender, to explore science and develop the skills necessary to replace what the Royal Academy of Engineering views as a retiring workforce. In response to a report commissioned by the Nuclear Industry Association (NIA) discussing the UK's plans for future energy production, she cautions: "There will be an unprecedented demand for new infrastructure to support the changes in the energy industry. There are not enough people going into university to study engineering and provide all the turbine specialists, heavy electrical engineers and construction engineers that will be required".

Committee service

EU Euratom Science and Technology Committee (Chair since 2010)
Nuclear Innovation and Research Advisory Board (Chair)
Board of Governors of Manchester University (since 2004)
Health and Safety Laboratory in Buxton (board member, 2006–2014)
Council for Science and Technology (2004–2011)
MacRobert Award Judging Panel for the Royal Academy of Engineering (Chair, 2015)
Particle Physics and Astronomy Research Council (Member, 1994–2001)
Council for The Engineering and Physical Sciences Research Council (EPSRC) (Member, 2005)
UK's Fusion Advisory for the Research Council (Chair)

Selected publications

For and Against with G. Kane (Engineering and Technology, 2011)
The UK must take the lead on carbon capture and storage (Financial Times, 2008)
Nuclear Energy: Current Situation and Prospects to 2020 (Philosophical Transactions of the Royal Society A, 2007)
South Africa nuclear project arousing US interest (Financial Times, 2005)
BNFL reactor far ahead on efficiency and safety (Financial Times, 2000)

Keynotes and interviews

Guest Speaker, QED conference, Manchester, UK (April 2015)
Keynote speaker, IChemE's Sustainable Nuclear Energy Conference, Manchester, UK (April 2014)
The nuclear power industry and the politics of power. The Life Scientific, Radio 4 (February 2013)
"How safe is nuclear power?" Infinite Monkey Cage, Radio 4, London, UK (November 2013)
Opportunities and Challenges Facing the Nuclear Power Industry, Athena Lecture at Imperial College (May 2004)

Personal life
She married John Albert Ion in 1980 and lives in Leyland, Lancashire.

Honours
Ion was appointed Officer of the Order of the British Empire (OBE) in the 2002 New Year Honours, Dame Commander of the Order of the British Empire (DBE) in the 2010 New Year Honours and Dame Grand Cross of the Order of the British Empire (GBE) in the 2022 Birthday Honours for services to engineering.

Scholastic

 Chancellor, visitor, governor, rector and fellowships

Honorary degrees

Memberships and fellowships

Awards

References

1955 births
Living people
People from Penwortham
Alumni of Imperial College London
Dames Grand Cross of the Order of the British Empire
Fellows of the Royal Academy of Engineering
Female Fellows of the Royal Academy of Engineering
Fellows of the Institution of Mechanical Engineers
British women engineers
British nuclear engineers
Fellows of the Royal Society
Female Fellows of the Royal Society
21st-century women engineers
Fellows of the Institute of Materials, Minerals and Mining